The 1994–95 NBA season was the Lakers' 47th season in the National Basketball Association, and 35th in the city of Los Angeles. This was the first season since 1981–82 that All-Star forward James Worthy was not on the team, as he announced his retirement in November. After missing the playoffs the previous season, the Lakers had the tenth pick in the 1994 NBA draft, and selected Eddie Jones out of Temple University. With new head coach Del Harris, along with the off-season acquisition of Cedric Ceballos from the Phoenix Suns, the Lakers struggled with a 3–5 start, but then won ten of their next twelve games, and held a 29–16 record at the All-Star break. Despite losing seven of their final eight games, the Lakers finished third in the Pacific Division with a 48–34 record, and returned to the playoffs after a one-year absence. Harris was named Coach of the Year.

Ceballos averaged 21.7 points and 8.0 rebounds per game, but only played 58 games due to a thumb injury, and was also selected for the 1995 NBA All-Star Game, but did not play due to injury, while second-year star Nick Van Exel emerged as one of the best point guards in the league, averaging 16.9 points and 8.3 assists per game, and Vlade Divac provided the team with 16.0 points, 10.4 rebounds and 2.2 blocks per game. In addition, Jones contributed 14.0 points and 2.0 steals per game, was named to the NBA All-Rookie First Team, and also won the MVP award in the Rookie Game during the All-Star Weekend in Phoenix, but only played 64 games due to a shoulder injury, while Elden Campbell provided with 12.5 points, 6.1 rebounds and 1.8 blocks per game, Anthony Peeler contributed 10.4 points per game, and Sedale Threatt averaged 9.5 points and 4.2 assists per game off the bench.

In the Western Conference First Round of the playoffs, the Lakers lost Game 1 to the 4th-seeded Seattle SuperSonics on the road, 96–71, but would win the next three games, thus the series. However, they would lose in the Western Conference Semi-finals to the San Antonio Spurs in six games. 

Following the season, Sam Bowie retired, while Kurt Rambis was released to free agency, and Tony Smith signed as a free agent with the Phoenix Suns.

Draft picks

Roster

Regular season

Season standings

z - clinched division title
y - clinched division title
x - clinched playoff spot

Record vs. opponents

Game log

Regular season

|- style="background:#cfc;"
| 1
| November 4
| @ Detroit
| W 115-98
| Nick Van Exel (35)
| Cedric Ceballos (14)
| Sedale Threatt (6)
| The Palace of Auburn Hills21,454
| 1-0
|- style="background:#fcc;"
| 2
| November 5
| @ Milwaukee
| L 96-97
| Cedric Ceballos (20)
| Cedric Ceballos (8)
| Vlade Divac (6)
| Bradley Center18,633
| 1-1
|- style="background:#fcc;""
| 3
| November 8
| @ New York
| L 113-117
| Nick Van Exel (26)
| Cedric Ceballos (14)
| Nick Van Exel (7)
| Madison Square Garden19,763
| 1-2
|- style="background:#cfc;"
| 4
| November 9
| @ Minnesota
| W 122-99
| Eddie Jones (31)
| Elden Campbell (9)
| Sedale Threatt (8)
| Target Center15,892
| 2-2
|- style="background:#fcc;"
| 5
| November 11
| Denver
| L 117-124 (OT)
| Nick Van Exel (21)
| Eddie Jones (9)
| Nick Van Exel (11)
| Great Western Forum16,950
| 2-3
|- style="background:#fcc;"
| 6
| November 12
| @ Golden State
| L 99-121
| Cedric Ceballos (20)
| Vlade Divac (10)
| Nick Van Exel (10)
| Oakland–Alameda County Coliseum Arena15,025
| 2-4
|- style="background:#cfc;"
| 15
| November 15
| @ L.A. Clippers
| W 102-92
| Ceballos & Divac (24)
| Vlade Divac (14)
| Nick Van Exel (8)
| Los Angeles Memorial Sports Arena8,807
| 3-4
|- style="background:#fcc;"
| 8
| November 16
| New York
| L 89-110
| Cedric Ceballos (19)
| Cedric Ceballos (12)
| Nick Van Exel (5)
| Great Western Forum13,630
| 3-5
|- style="background:#cfc;"
| 9
| November 18
| Cleveland
| W 82-80
| Nick Van Exel (22)
| Cedric Ceballos (9)
| Nick Van Exel (10)
| Great Western Forum10,177
| 4-5
|- style="background:#cfc;"
| 10
| November 23
| Dallas
| W 118-106
| Vlade Divac (27)
| Cedric Ceballos (8)
| Nick Van Exel (8)
| Great Western Forum11,124
| 5-5
|- style="background:#cfc;"
| 11
| November 25
| @ Atlanta
| W 92-87
| Vlade Divac (15)
| Vlade Divac (16)
| Vlade Divac (6)
| Omni Coliseum14,239
| 6-5
|- style="background:#cfc;"
| 12
| November 26
| @ Washington
| W 112-96
| Nick Van Exel (22)
| Cedric Ceballos (14)
| Nick Van Exel (13)
| USAir Arena18,756
| 7-5
|- style="background:#cfc;"
| 13
| November 29
| @ New Jersey
| W 129-120 (2OT)
| Cedric Ceballos (34)
| Elden Campbell (12)
| Nick Van Exel (13)
| Brendan Byrne Arena12,211
| 8-5
|- style="background:#fcc;"
| 14
| November 30
| @ Cleveland
| L 79-117
| Vlade Divac (14)
| Vlade Divac (8)
| Nick Van Exel (4)
| Gund Arena19,014
| 8-6

|- style="background:#cfc;"
| 15
| December 2
| Houston
| W 107–89
| Cedric Ceballos (25)
| Cedric Ceballos (16)
| Vlade Divac (8)
| Great Western Forum13,056
| 9-6
|- style="background:#cfc;"
| 16
| December 6
| Golden State
| W 113-101
| Cedric Ceballos (28)
| Vlade Divac (14)
| Nick Van Exel (14)
| Great Western Forum10,579
| 10-6
|- style="background:#fcc;"
| 17
| December 9
| L.A. Clippers
| L 84-109
| Cedric Ceballos (23)
| Vlade Divac (17)
| Nick Van Exel (6)
| Great Western Forum10,768
| 10-7
|- style="background:#cfc;"
| 18
| December 10
| @ Utah
| W 120-113
| Sedale Threatt (38)
| Vlade Divac (13)
| Sedale Threatt (8)
| Delta Center19,911
| 11-7
|- style="background:#cfc;"
| 19
| December 13
| @ Dallas
| W 115-108
| Nick Van Exel (35)
| Cedric Ceballos (10)
| Nick Van Exel (10)
| Reunion Arena15,150
| 12-7
|- style="background:#cfc;"
| 20
| December 15
| @ Houston
| W 97–94
| Cedric Ceballos (36)
| Vlade Divac (11)
| Nick Van Exel (7)
| The Summit11,943
| 13-7
|- style="background:#fcc;"
| 21
| December 17
| @ San Antonio
| L 102-116
| Nick Van Exel (19)
| Elden Campbell (11)
| Nick Van Exel (6)
| Alamodome16,439
| 13-8
|- style="background:#cfc;"
| 22
| December 20
| Minnesota
| W 108-95
| Cedric Ceballos (50)
| Cedric Ceballos (9)
| Nick Van Exel (13)
| Great Western Forum11,101
| 14-8
|- style="background:#cfc;"
| 23
| December 23
| Sacramento
| W 100-89
| Eddie Jones (27)
| Vlade Divac (10)
| Nick Van Exel (6)
| Great Western Forum12,637
| 15-8
|- style="background:#fcc;"
| 24
| December 27
| @ Golden State
| L 105-129
| Cedric Ceballos (24)
| Cedric Ceballos (11)
| Nick Van Exel (11)
| Oakland–Alameda County Coliseum Arena15,025
| 15-9
|- style="background:#cfc;"
| 25
| December 29
| Seattle
| W 96-95
| Cedric Ceballos (35)
| Campbell & Ceballos (10)
| Nick Van Exel (7)
| Great Western Forum17,505
| 16-9
|- style="background:#cfc;"
| 26
| December 30
| @ Phoenix
| W 127-112
| Cedric Ceballos (37)
| Elden Campbell (12)
| Nick Van Exel (16)
| American West Arena19,023
| 17-9

|- style="background:#cfc;"
| 27
| January 3
| Detroit
| W 105-96
| Vlade Divac (23)
| Ceballos & Divac (10)
| Nick Van Exel (9)
| Great Western Forum13,228
| 18-9
|- style="background:#cfc;"
| 28
| January 6
| Milwaukee
| W 106-98
| Eddie Jones (26)
| Sam Bowie (10)
| Vlade Divac (6)
| Great Western Forum13,227
| 19-9
|- style="background:#cfc;"
| 29
| January 8
| Miami
| W 122-105
| Anthony Peeler (23)
| Vlade Divac (11)
| Divac & Van Exel (10)
| Great Western Forum12,997
| 20-9
|- style="background:#fcc;"
| 30
| January 9
| @ Portland
| L 83-129
| Tony Smith (19)
| George Lynch (7)
| Sam Bowie (5)
| Memorial Coliseum12,888
| 20-10
|- style="background:#fcc;"
| 31
| January 11
| Phoenix
| L 108-118
| Nick Van Exel (35)
| Sam Bowie (9)
| Nick Van Exel (7)
| Great Western Forum17,505
| 20-11
|- style="background:#cfc;"
| 32
| January 13
| Golden State
| W 115-104
| Ceballos & Van Exel (24)
| Vlade Divac (12)
| Nick Van Exel (14)
| Great Western Forum13,182
| 21-11
|- style="background:#cfc;"
| 33
| January 16
| L.A. Clippers
| W 96-88
| Nick Van Exel (24)
| Cedric Ceballos (13)
| Nick Van Exel (6)
| Great Western Forum11,326
| 22-11
|- style="background:#fcc;"
| 34
| January 18
| @ Indiana
| L 105-106
| Nick Van Exel (30)
| George Lynch (8)
| Nick Van Exel (10)
| Market Square Arena14,061
| 22-12
|- style="background:#cfc;"
| 35
| January 20
| @ Boston
| W 120-118
| Cedric Ceballos (31)
| Elden Campbell (9)
| Nick Van Exel (10)
| Boston Garden14,890
| 23-12
|- style="background:#fcc;"
| 36
| January 21
| @ Philadelphia
| L 113-117 (OT)
| Cedric Ceballos (31)
| Cedric Ceballos (11)
| Nick Van Exel (9)
| CoreStates Spectrum14,235
| 23-13
|- style="background:#cfc;"
| 37
| January 23
| @ Charlotte
| W 108-102
| Ceballos & Van Exel (26)
| Vlade Divac (15)
| Nick Van Exel (9)
| Charlotte Coliseum23,698
| 24-13
|- style="background:#cfc;"
| 38
| January 25
| New Jersey
| W 120-116 (OT)
| Cedric Ceballos (33)
| Vlade Divac (15)
| Nick Van Exel (15)
| Great Western Forum11,140
| 25-13
|- style="background:#cfc;"
| 39
| January 28
| @ Seattle
| W 128-121 (OT)
| Elden Campbell (27)
| Vlade Divac (15)
| Bowie & Divac (5) 
| Tacoma Dome17,426
| 26-13
|- style="background:#fcc;"
| 40
| January 31
| Chicago
| L 115-119
| Nick Van Exel (27)
| Vlade Divac (13)
| Nick Van Exel (16)
| Great Western Forum17,505
| 26-14

|- style="background:#fcc;"
| 41
| February 1
| @ Phoenix
| L 109-118
| Eddie Jones (26)
| Vlade Divac (14)
| Nick Van Exel (10)
| American West Arena19,023
| 26-15
|- style="background:#fcc;"
| 42
| February 3
| Denver
| L 74-88
| Vlade Divac (27)
| Vlade Divac (15)
| Nick Van Exel (6)
| Great Western Forum14,493
| 26-16
|- style="background:#cfc;"
| 43
| February 4
| @ L.A. Clippers
| W 121-118
| Eddie Jones (30)
| 4 players tied (5)
| Nick Van Exel (7)
| Los Angeles Memorial Sports Arena16,021
| 27-16
|- style="background:#cfc;"
| 44
| February 7
| @ Denver
| W 85-83
| Eddie Jones (20)
| Vlade Divac (13)
| Nick Van Exel (4)
| McNichols Sports Arena17,171
| 28-16
|- style="background:#cfc;"
| 45
| February 8
| San Antonio
| W 115-99
| Anthony Peeler (26)
| Vlade Divac (15)
| Nick Van Exel (10)
| Great Western Forum14,175
| 29-16
|- align="center"
|colspan="9" bgcolor="#bbcaff"|All-Star Break
|- style="background:#cfc;"
|- bgcolor="#bbffbb"
|- style="background:#cfc;"
| 46
| February 15
| Seattle
| W 102-96
| Jones & Van Exel (19)
| Vlade Divac (11)
| Nick Van Exel (9)
| Great Western Forum14,936
| 30-16
|- style="background:#fcc;"
| 47
| February 16
| @ Sacramento
| L 82-98
| Eddie Jones (18)
| Eddie Jones (10)
| Vlade Divac (6)
| ARCO Arena17,317
| 30-17
|- style="background:#cfc;"
| 48
| February 19
| Portland
| W 93-83
| Anthony Peeler (21)
| Vlade Divac (16)
| Nick Van Exel (13)
| Great Western Forum17,505
| 31-17
|- style="background:#cfc;"
| 49
| February 20
| @ Seattle
| W 108-105
| Nick Van Exel (40)
| Nick Van Exel (7)
| Vlade Divac (8)
| Tacoma Dome16,502
| 32-17
|- style="background:#cfc;"
| 50
| February 22
| Philadelphia
| W 112-100
| Anthony Peeler (21)
| Vlade Divac (12)
| Divac & Threatt (8)
| Great Western Forum12,524
| 33-17
|- style="background:#cfc;"
| 51
| February 24
| Charlotte
| W 95-93 (OT)
| Anthony Peeler (27)
| Vlade Divac (24)
| Vlade Divac (8)
| Great Western Forum17,505
| 34-17
|- style="background:#fcc;"
| 52
| February 25
| @ L.A. Clippers
| L 81-83
| Vlade Divac (20)
| Vlade Divac (20)
| Nick Van Exel (6)
| Los Angeles Memorial Sports Arena16,021
| 34-18
|- style="background:#fcc;"
| 53
| February 27
| Utah
| L 95-101
| Elden Campbell (25)
| Vlade Divac (11)
| Vlade Divac (8)
| Great Western Forum14,230
| 34-19

|- style="background:#fcc;"
| 54
| March 1
| Phoenix
| L 93-101
| Anthony Peeler (25)
| Vlade Divac (15)
| Nick Van Exel (10)
| Great Western Forum17,505
| 34-20
|- style="background:#cfc;"
| 55
| March 3
| Sacramento
| W 109-104 (2OT)
| Vlade Divac (27)
| Vlade Divac (19)
| Nick Van Exel (11)
| Great Western Forum12,040
| 35-20
|- style="background:#cfc;"
| 56
| March 5
| Minnesota
| W 105-102
| Vlade Divac (30)
| Vlade Divac (14)
| Nick Van Exel (17)
| Great Western Forum11,943
| 36-20
|- style="background:#fcc;"
| 57
| March 7
| @ Miami
| L 104-110
| Divac & Peeler (23)
| Anthony Miller (13)
| Divac & Van Exel (7)
| Miami Arena14,452
| 36-21
|- style="background:#fcc;"
| 58
| March 8
| @ Orlando
| L 110-114
| Anthony Peeler (26)
| Vlade Divac (15)
| Nick Van Exel (10)
| Orlando Arena16,010
| 36-22
|- style="background:#fcc;"
| 59
| March 10
| @ Minnesota
| L 103-109
| Sedale Threatt (26)
| Vlade Divac (9)
| Sam Bowie (8)
| Target Center17,891
| 36-23
|- style="background:#cfc;"
| 60
| March 11
| @ Chicago
| W 108-105
| Anthony Peeler (22)
| Vlade Divac (14)
| Divac & Threatt (7)
| United Center22,404
| 37-23
|- style="background:#cfc;"
| 61
| March 13
| Indiana
| W 93-91
| Lloyd Daniels (22)
| Anthony Miller (11)
| Sedale Threatt (9)
| Great Western Forum12,764
| 38-23
|- style="background:#fcc;"
| 62
| March 15
| @ Golden State
| L 108-119
| Vlade Divac (27)
| Vlade Divac (14)
| Nick Van Exel (12)
| Oakland–Alameda County Coliseum Arena15,025
| 38-24
|- style="background:#fcc;"
| 63
| March 17
| Boston
| L 92-118
| Divac & Threatt (14)
| Vlade Divac (5)
| Sedale Threatt (9)
| Great Western Forum15,087
| 38-25
|- style="background:#cfc;"
| 64
| March 19
| Sacramento
| W 121-116
| Nick Van Exel (35)
| Sam Bowie (11)
| Nick Van Exel (8)
| Great Western Forum13,219
| 39-25
|- style="background:#cfc;"
| 65
| March 22
| Portland
| W 121-114
| Elden Campbell (32)
| Elden Campbell (11)
| Nick Van Exel (10)
| Great Western Forum12,123
| 40-25
|- style="background:#cfc;"
| 66
| March 24
| Washington
| W 113-103
| Vlade Divac (25)
| Vlade Divac (20)
| Nick Van Exel (12)
| Great Western Forum14,144
| 41-25
|- style="background:#cfc;"
| 67
| March 26
| Houston
| W 107–96
| Vlade Divac (27)
| Elden Campbell (12)
| Nick Van Exel (9)
| Great Western Forum17,505
| 42-25
|- style="background:#cfc;"
| 68
| March 28
| @ Houston
| W 106–96
| Campbell & Ceballos (17)
| Campbell & Miller (13)
| Nick Van Exel (9)
| The Summit16,611
| 43-25
|- style="background:#fcc;"
| 69
| March 29
| @ San Antonio
| L 84-107
| Cedric Ceballos (17)
| Vlade Divac (14)
| Nick Van Exel (7)
| Alamodome18,027
| 43-26
|- style="background:#cfc;"
| 70
| March 31
| Atlanta
| W 121-107
| Cedric Ceballos (25)
| Vlade Divac (13)
| Nick Van Exel (8)
| Great Western Forum16,760
| 44-26

|- style="background:#cfc;"
| 71
| April 2
| Orlando
| W 119-112
| Cedric Ceballos (33)
| Cedric Ceballos (8)
| Nick Van Exel (9)
| Great Western Forum17,505
| 45-26
|- style="background:#cfc;"
| 72
| April 4
| @ Denver
| W 104-101
| Jones & Van Exel (19)
| Cedric Ceballos (8)
| Eddie Jones (5)
| McNichols Sports Arena17,171
| 46-26
|- style="background:#fcc;"
| 73
| April 5
| @ Dallas
| L 111-130
| Nick Van Exel (24)
| Vlade Divac (10)
| Elden Campbell (5)
| Reunion Arena17,502
| 46-27
|- style="background:#cfc;"
| 74
| April 7
| Utah
| W 113-90
| Cedric Ceballos (36)
| Cedric Ceballos (11)
| Nick Van Exel (8)
| Great Western Forum17,505
| 47-27
|- style="background:#fcc;"
| 75
| April 9
| San Antonio
| L 87-101
| Cedric Ceballos (26)
| Vlade Divac (17)
| Vlade Divac (7)
| Great Western Forum17,505
| 47-28
|- style="background:#fcc;"
| 76
| April 11
| @ Utah
| L 93-100
| Eddie Jones (23)
| Elden Campbell (11)
| Tony Smith (5)
| Delta Center19,911
| 47-29
|- style="background:#fcc;"
| 77
| April 12
| @ Sacramento
| L 99-109
| Vlade Divac (24)
| Vlade Divac (15)
| Nick Van Exel (9)
| ARCO Arena17,317
| 47-30
|- style="background:#fcc;"
| 78
| April 15
| @ Phoenix
| L 114-119
| Cedric Ceballos (40)
| Elden Campbell (15)
| Nick Van Exel (15)
| American West Arena19,023
| 47-31
|- style="background:#cfc;"
| 79
| April 16
| Dallas
| W 125-111
| Cedric Ceballos (33)
| Vlade Divac (13)
| Nick Van Exel (14)
| Great Western Forum17,505
| 48-31
|- style="background:#fcc;"
| 80
| April 18
| Seattle
| L 97-113
| Anthony Peeler (18)
| Anthony Miller (9)
| Tony Smith (7)
| Great Western Forum17,505
| 48-32
|- style="background:#fcc;"
| 81
| April 20
| @ Portland
| L 97-111
| Cedric Ceballos (36)
| Sam Bowie (15)
| Nick Van Exel (7)
| Memorial Coliseum12,888
| 48-33
|- style="background:#fcc;"
| 82
| April 22
| Portland
| L 104-109
| Anthony Peeler (22)
| Elden Campbell (7)
| Nick Van Exel (7)
| Great Western Forum17,505
| 48-34

Playoffs

|- style="background:#fcc;"
| 1
| April 27
| @ Seattle
| L 71–96
| Nick Van Exel (29)
| Campbell & Divac (6)
| 4 players tied (2)
| Tacoma Dome14,073
| 0–1
|- style="background:#cfc;"
| 2
| April 29
| @ Seattle
| W 84–82
| Cedric Ceballos (25)
| Vlade Divac (7)
| Vlade Divac (6)
| Tacoma Dome14,681
| 1–1
|- style="background:#cfc;"
| 3
| May 1
| Seattle
| W 105–101
| Cedric Ceballos (24)
| Vlade Divac (9)
| Ceballos & Van Exel (6)
| Great Western Forum17,505
| 2–1
|- style="background:#cfc;"
| 4
| May 4
| Seattle
| W 114–110
| Nick Van Exel (34)
| Vlade Divac (11)
| Nick Van Exel (9)
| Great Western Forum17,505
| 3–1

|- style="background:#fcc;"
| 1
| May 6
| @ San Antonio
| L 94–110
| Elden Campbell (29)
| Vlade Divac (11)
| Nick Van Exel (12)
| Alamodome24,002
| 0–1
|- style="background:#fcc;"
| 2
| May 8
| @ San Antonio
| L 90–97 (OT)
| Elden Campbell (25)
| Elden Campbell (18)
| Nick Van Exel (10)
| Alamodome26,127
| 0–2
|- style="background:#cfc;"
| 3
| May 12
| San Antonio
| W 92–85
| Nick Van Exel (25)
| Vlade Divac (13)
| Nick Van Exel (8)
| Great Western Forum17,505
| 1–2
|- style="background:#fcc;"
| 4
| May 14
| San Antonio
| L 71–80
| Vlade Divac (14)
| George Lynch (8)
| Peeler & Van Exel (5)
| Great Western Forum17,505
| 1–3
|- style="background:#cfc;"
| 5
| May 16
| @ San Antonio
| W 98–96 (OT)
| Nick Van Exel (22)
| Vlade Divac (15)
| Nick Van Exel (7)
| Alamodome35,888
| 2–3
|- style="background:#fcc;"
| 6
| May 18
| San Antonio
| L 88–100
| Elden Campbell (21)
| Elden Campbell (8)
| Nick Van Exel (11)
| Great Western Forum17,505
| 2–4
|-

Player statistics

Season

1. Statistics with the Lakers.

Playoffs

Awards and records

Awards
All-NBA Rookie Teams 
 Eddie Jones – All-NBA Rookie First Team

1995 NBA All-Star Game 
 Cedric Ceballos (first participation)

Transactions

Trades

Free agents

Player Transactions Citation:

References

Los Angeles Lakers seasons
Los Angle
Los Angle
Los Angle